Estádio Onésio Brasileiro Alvarenga, also known as Estádio Vila Nova, or Estádio OBA, is a multi-use stadium located in Centro neighborhood, Goiânia, Brazil. It is used mostly for football matches and hosts the home matches of Vila Nova Futebol Clube. The stadium has a maximum capacity of 11,788 people.

It is named after Onésio Brasileiro Alvarenga, a Vila Nova's former player and former director, who was responsible for the club's professionalization.

External links
Vila Nova's official website
Templos do Futebol

Onesio Brasileiro Alvarenga